Tyler E. Higgins (born April 22, 1991) is an American professional baseball pitcher for the High Point Rockers of the Atlantic League of Professional Baseball. He previously played for the Orix Buffaloes of Nippon Professional Baseball (NPB).

Career

Florida/Miami Marlins
The Florida Marlins chose Higgins in the 23rd round, 703rd overall, in the 2011 Major League Baseball draft. Higgins made his professional debut with the GCL Marlins. In 2012, Higgins split the year between the GCL Marlins and the High-A Jupiter Hammerheads, pitching to a 2.57 ERA in 23 appearances. He spent the 2013 season in Jupiter, recording a 2-7 record and 4.01 ERA in 45 games. He spent the 2014 season in Double-A with the Jacksonville Suns, registering a 4.97 ERA in 29.0 innings of work. In 2015, he split the year between Jacksonville and Jupiter, accumulating a 3.55 ERA with 41 strikeouts in 50.2 innings pitched. He spent the entirety of the 2016 season in Jacksonville, pitching to a 3-5 record and 3.45 ERA with 45 strikeouts in 44 appearances. In 2017, Higgins again spent the year in Jacksonville, posting a 3-3 record and 3.43 ERA in 60.1 innings pitched across 34 games. On November 6, 2017, he elected free agency.

New Britain Bees
On March 27, 2018, Higgins signed with the New Britain Bees of the Atlantic League of Professional Baseball. Higgins pitched to a stellar 1.88 ERA in 14 appearances for New Britain.

Seattle Mariners
On June 1, 2018, Higgins' contract was purchased by the Seattle Mariners organization and he was assigned to the Triple-A Tacoma Rainiers. In 28 games for Tacoma, Higgins posted a 2.83 ERA with 38 strikeouts. On November 2, 2018, he elected free agency.

San Diego Padres
On December 21, 2018, Higgins signed a minor league contract with the San Diego Padres organization. He split the season between the Triple-A El Paso Chihuahuas and the Double-A Amarillo Sod Poodles, recording a 5-1 record and 4.75 ERA between the two clubs. On December 18, 2019, Higgins was released by the Padres.

Orix Buffaloes
On December 23, 2019, Higgins signed with the Orix Buffaloes of the Nippon Professional Baseball (NPB). On June 26, 2020, Higgins made his NPB debut. In 41 appearances for Orix, Higgins pitched to a 2.40 ERA with 45 strikeouts. On February 11, 2021, Higgins tested positive for COVID-19. Higgins made 49 appearances for Orix in 2021, logging a 2.53 ERA with 36 strikeouts in 46.1 innings of work. Higgins became a free agent following the season.

San Diego Padres (second stint)
On March 7, 2022, Higgins signed a minor league contract to return to the San Diego Padres organization. He was released on July 12, 2022.

High Point Rockers
On August 4, 2022, Higgins signed with the High Point Rockers of the Atlantic League of Professional Baseball.

References

External links

1991 births
Living people
Amarillo Sod Poodles players
American expatriate baseball players in Japan
Baseball players from Michigan
El Paso Chihuahuas players
Gulf Coast Marlins players
Jacksonville Jumbo Shrimp players
Jacksonville Suns players
Jupiter Hammerheads players
Lake Elsinore Storm players
Naranjeros de Hermosillo players
American expatriate baseball players in Mexico
New Britain Bees players
Nippon Professional Baseball pitchers
Orix Buffaloes players
People from Alma, Michigan
Tacoma Rainiers players